Maitland, an electoral district of the Legislative Assembly in the Australian state of New South Wales, was created in 1904 returning a single member. Between 1920 and 1927 it returned three member.  It has returned a single member from 1927 to the present.


Election results

Elections in the 2010s

2019

2015

2011

Elections in the 2000s

2007

2003

Elections in the 1990s

1999

1995

1991

Elections in the 1980s

1988

1984

1981

1981 by-election

Elections in the 1970s

1978

1976

1973

1971

Elections in the 1960s

1968

1965

1962

Elections in the 1950s

1959

1956

1953

1950

Elections in the 1940s

1947

1944

1941

Elections in the 1930s

1938

1935

1932

1930

Elections in the 1920s

1927
This section is an excerpt from 1927 New South Wales state election § Maitland

1925
This section is an excerpt from 1925 New South Wales state election § Maitland

1922
This section is an excerpt from 1922 New South Wales state election § Maitland

1920
This section is an excerpt from 1920 New South Wales state election § Maitland

Elections in the 1910s

1917
This section is an excerpt from 1917 New South Wales state election § Maitland

1913
This section is an excerpt from 1913 New South Wales state election § Maitland

1911 by-election

1910

Elections in the 1900s

1907
This section is an excerpt from 1907 New South Wales state election § Maitland

1904
This section is an excerpt from 1904 New South Wales state election § Maitland

Notes

References

New South Wales state electoral results by district